Masasteron is a genus of spiders in the family Zodariidae. It was first described in 2004 by Baehr. , it contains 21 Australian species.

Species

Masasteron comprises the following species:
Masasteron barkly Baehr, 2004
Masasteron bennieae Baehr, 2004
Masasteron bipunctatum Baehr, 2004
Masasteron burbidgei Baehr, 2004
Masasteron clifton Baehr, 2004
Masasteron complector Baehr, 2004
Masasteron darwin Baehr, 2004
Masasteron derby Baehr, 2004
Masasteron deserticola Baehr, 2004
Masasteron gracilis Baehr, 2004
Masasteron haroldi Baehr, 2004
Masasteron mackenziei Baehr, 2004
Masasteron maini Baehr, 2004
Masasteron mas (Jocqué, 1991)
Masasteron ocellum Baehr, 2004
Masasteron piankai Baehr, 2004
Masasteron queensland Baehr, 2004
Masasteron sampeyae Baehr, 2004
Masasteron tealei Baehr, 2004
Masasteron tuart Baehr, 2004
Masasteron utae Baehr, 2004

References

Zodariidae
Araneomorphae genera
Spiders of Australia